Coca-Cola Coliseum (also or formerly known as CNE Coliseum, Royal Coliseum,  Ricoh Coliseum, Toronto Coliseum or Coliseum) is an arena at Exhibition Place in Toronto, Ontario, Canada, used for agricultural displays, ice hockey, and trade shows. It was built for the Canadian National Exhibition (CNE) and the Royal Agricultural Winter Fair (the Royal) in 1921. Since 1997 it has been part of the Enercare Centre exhibition complex. It serves as the home arena of the Toronto Marlies ice hockey team, the American Hockey League farm team of the Toronto Maple Leafs. For the 2015 Pan American Games the venue hosted the gymnastics competitions and was known as the Toronto Coliseum.

History
On January 1, 1920, Toronto voters approved by plebiscite a proposal by the Royal Agricultural Fair Association to construct, at a maximum cost of  million, a new arena for livestock. The City of Toronto government (City) made a call for tenders in the fall of 1920 but the lowest tender was  million, exceeding the mandate approved by plebiscite. The size of the planned building was reduced by half in an attempt to get the cost under  million and a new call for tenders was done. There was a reticence to hire a Montreal firm, and the city held off on awarding the contract while Price sought out construction offers from local firms to do the work using day labour, although the legality of this was questioned. Another issue raised was that the revised arena design needed to be expanded to meet the fair's needs. Anglin-Norcross offered to do the work at a further . It took two City Council votes, but Council finally approved the awarding of the contract to Anglin-Norcross on May 26, 1921. Demolition of existing buildings (likely the area with livestock stalls) on the site commenced a few days later and arena work commenced in June 1921.

The Fair Association had hoped for the arena to be open by the fall of 1921 to inaugurate the new fair, but it was not ready. The  million ( in  dollars) building had its official public opening on December 16, 1921, attended by 5,000 persons to see an athletic meet put on by the "Sportsmen Patriotic Association."  Upon completion, the building was billed as the largest of its kind in North America. The name "Coliseum" was given to the building in 1922, in time for the opening of the CNE. The main entrance was to the north, along Manitoba Drive. The southern side of the building was along the main TTC streetcar rail lines serving the CNE, which separated the Coliseum and Industry Buildings to the north, and the later Engineering and Electrical Building (1928) to the south. In 1926, additions were built and the complex was claimed to be the largest structure of its kind under one roof in the world. In 1931, the Horse Palace was built next door to provide a permanent building for the stables of the Winter Fair.
From 1942 to 1945, the building was used as a training base for the Royal Canadian Air Force during World War II and known as the 'Manning Depot'. A photo of it as the RCAF Manning Depot is in the New Westminster Museum and Archives # IHP9562-003. After the war, it mainly hosted equestrian events for the Royal Agricultural Winter Fair, the CNE and other events. The arena was also used as a horse barn.

In time for the 1963 CNE, the southern facade was reconstructed. As part of the renovation, the southern facade was reclad with black, grey and white siding and a new front plaza was built, with a large "COLISEUM" sign on top. The CNE spent  million from 1960 until 1963 on "face-lifting" the Coliseum. In 1997, the National Trade Centre (now the Enercare Centre) exhibition complex was built. The new project removed the 1963 entrance and cladding, restoring the original facade, although the cupola towers on the southern facade had been removed in the 1963 renovation. Access to the Coliseum was moved to the western entrance of the exhibition complex through a hall known as Heritage Court.

In November 2002, the City of Toronto agreed to an extensive renovation of the Coliseum to attract a professional ice hockey team to the arena.  At a cost of  million, the arena's capacity was expanded from 6,500 to 9,700 by building a new higher roof, lowering the floor, adding new seats in the expanded area  and the installation of 38 private suites.  Borealis Infrastructure contributed  million up front and  million of borrowed funds in return for a 49-year lease to the arena.  The City of Toronto invested  million in the project and guaranteed Borealis' loans, while remaining the owner of the building.

In 2003, Japanese office supply company Ricoh purchased the naming rights to the new facility for  million over ten years, with an optional five-year extension.

During the summer of 2015, a new scoreboard was installed at the Air Canada Centre, and the old scoreboard was installed at the Coliseum.

In 2018, MLSE announced that the Toronto Argonauts football operations offices and weight rooms would be relocated to the Coliseum in late June of that year. On July 11, 2018, at the end of Ricoh's partnership with the building, Coca-Cola purchased the naming rights to the facility for ten years, renaming it the "Coca-Cola Coliseum".

Usage
Since November 1922, the Coliseum has been used by the Royal Agricultural Winter Fair held in November annually except during the years of World War II. The Fair uses the arena for the annual "Royal Horse Show" equestrian competition, as well as animal presentations.

Each year in August, the Coliseum is used by the CNE for exhibits and performances. It has in the past used for CNE cat, dog and horse shows. Until 2013, the CNE held the CNE Horse Show, a competitive event in the Coliseum. At one time run during the Ex, it changed to be a pre-CNE event in 2005. It has been used by the Royal Canadian Mounted Police Musical Ride. During the 2009, 2010 and 2011 CNE, it was used for a figure skating show.

The arena is also used for trade shows. The annual Boat Show builds an indoor pond over the arena floor.

Ice hockey
As early as the 1970s, plans were floated to outfit CNE Coliseum for ice hockey. When the World Hockey Association's Ottawa Nationals moved to Toronto as the Toronto Toros, they initially wanted to play at a renovated CNE Coliseum. However, due to objections from Maple Leafs vice president Bill Ballard, the Toros played at Varsity Arena before briefly becoming tenants of the Leafs at Maple Leaf Gardens.

In the early 2000s, there were efforts to bring a minor professional hockey team to the Coliseum.  Plans to move the dormant Phoenix Roadrunners of the International Hockey League to Toronto for the 2002–2003 season fell apart when the league dissolved and six teams, but not the Roadrunners, were absorbed by the American Hockey League (AHL) in the summer of 2001.  The same group then attempted to purchase the Louisville Panthers AHL franchise, which had suspended operations for the 2001–2002 season, and relocate it to the Coliseum, but the AHL voted against the transaction in December 2001.  The Toronto Maple Leafs pressured the Hamilton Bulldogs, who held territorial rights to Toronto since it fell within their 50-mile home territory, to veto the transaction.  The Leafs reportedly did not want the Coliseum to be upgraded as it would compete with their newly opened Air Canada Centre.  Next, the group began pursuing the Bulldogs, which were owned by their NHL affiliate the Edmonton Oilers.  The Bulldogs did not require league approval to move to Toronto since the Coliseum was within their territory. An agreement was reached with the Oilers to relocate the Bulldogs to Toronto, and to rename them the Toronto Roadrunners.  Borealis signed a 49-year sublease to the building with the Roadrunners for $9,500 per game.

On November 1, 2003, the Coliseum made its debut as an ice hockey venue, as the Roadrunners tied the Rochester Americans 1-1.  However, the Roadrunners' lease was terminated in June 2004, following their first season, for defaulting on its rent.  The Oilers chose to relocate the Roadrunners to Edmonton for the following season due to poor attendance and in anticipation of the impending NHL lockout.

The Coliseum was left without a hockey tenant for a year, but in August 2004 Maple Leaf Sports & Entertainment announced that they would relocate their AHL farm team from St. John's, Newfoundland to Toronto to play in the Coliseum for the 2005–2006 season, after agreeing on a 20-year lease for the arena. Their lease calls for rent to cover debt financing charges, property taxes and generate a return to the arena investors, which exceeds $4 million annually. The team, which was subsequently renamed the Toronto Marlies, debuted in their new home on October 12, 2005, with a 5–2 victory over the Syracuse Crunch, in front of a crowd of 8,056. The Coliseum hosted the 2007 AHL All-Star Game on January 29, 2007.

On October 27, 2021, the city of St. John's voted to evict the Newfoundland Growlers from their home arena of Mary Brown's Centre, citing workplace harassment of arena employees. The Growlers initially reached an agreement to relocate their first six home games to be at the Coca-Cola Coliseum in Toronto, however they subsequently came to an agreement with the nearby city of Conception Bay South to play in the games at their local arena.

Other sports

On April 4, 1922, it was the site of the Johnny Dundee vs Jimmy Goodrich boxing match promoted by Jack Corcoran that set a new indoor sports attendance record for Toronto with 11,900 spectators packed into the building. The mark would stand until the construction of Maple Leaf Gardens in 1931. 
In 1974, the Coliseum hosted half the home games for the Toronto-Buffalo Royals of World Team Tennis alongside the Buffalo Memorial Auditorium in Buffalo, New York for one season before the team was contracted by the league in 1975. 
The Coliseum hosted the Lingerie Football League's Toronto Triumph in their lone season in operation in 2012. 
From July 11 to 20, 2015, the Coliseum hosted the gymnastics competition of the 2015 Pan American Games, during which it was known as the "Toronto Coliseum." 
The Coliseum hosted the Longines World Cup Jumping (Equestrian) Championships in November 2015.
The Coliseum hosted events as part of the 2016 NBA All-Star Weekend in Toronto over 2 days: 
the 2016 NBA Celebrity All-Star Game on February 12, 2016.
the NBA All-Star open practice and NBA D-League All-Star Game on February 13, 2016.
The Coliseum hosted the Canada-Netherlands Davis Cup tie September 14–16, 2018, which featured Daniel Nestor’s final competitive match.

Concerts
The Coliseum has been used for numerous musical concerts. Acts that have performed there include Playboi Carti, Jimi Hendrix, The Doors,  The Who, Genesis, Bob Dylan, Vanilla Fudge, Mötley Crüe, G.E.M. and Kraftwerk. From 1922 to 1934, the CNE's Canadian National Exhibition Chorus performed in the arena. In 2007, the Coliseum hosted the first We Day concert.

Professional wrestling 
In March 2016, the Coliseum hosted the WWE Network special Roadblock.

All Elite Wrestling (AEW) scheduled its first ever Canadian shows at the Coliseum, with a live broadcast of AEW Dynamite on October 12, 2022, and a taping of Rampage the following night.

See also
List of indoor arenas in Canada
Venues of the 2015 Pan American and Parapan American Games

References

External links

 Official web site
 Picture of 1963 facade

Coca-Cola buildings and structures
Ice hockey venues in Toronto
Indoor arenas in Ontario
Indoor ice hockey venues in Ontario
Music venues in Toronto
Sports venues in Toronto
Maple Leaf Sports & Entertainment
Toronto Marlies
Toronto Roadrunners
Buildings and structures completed in 1921
Venues of the 2015 Pan American Games
Exhibition Place
1921 establishments in Ontario
City of Toronto Heritage Properties
Gymnastics venues
Equestrian venues in Ontario
Sports venues completed in 1921